Alacranes Rojos de Apatzingán is a soccer team located in the small city of Apatzingan, Michoacán, Mexico. The team plays in the Segunda division league, the third tier in the Mexican League System. The team has competed in the championship finals several times, losing each time.

References

1970 establishments in Mexico